Kalisz Governorate was an administrative unit (a governorate) of Congress Poland.

History
It was created in 1837 from the Kalisz Voivodeship, and had the same borders and centre (Kalisz) as the voivodeship.

The Reform of 1844 merged the governorate into the larger Warsaw Governorate, until the 1867 reform which reversed those changes and recreated the Kalisz Governorate.

Language

References and notes

External links
 Gubernia kaliska w Słowniku geograficznym Królestwa Polskiego i innych krajów słowiańskich, Tom III (Haag — Kępy) z 1882 r. 
Geographical Dictionary of the Kingdom of Poland

 
Governorates of Congress Poland
States and territories established in 1837
Establishments in Congress Poland